"1939 Returning" and "Chicken vs. Macho" are songs by British indie rock band The Crocketts. "1939 Returning" was produced by Charlie Francis, and "Chicken vs. Macho" (which features guest vocalist Mary Hopkin) was produced by Francis with Bird & Bush. The two tracks were featured on the band's 2000 second album The Great Brain Robbery, and released together as its third and final single on 16 October 2000.

Composition
Writer and vocalist Davey MacManus has provided the following explanation of the meaning of "1939 Returning":

Speaking about "Chicken vs. Macho", he provided the following insight:

Reception
In his unfavourable review of The Great Brain Robbery, Melody Maker writer Daniel Booth identified "1939 Returning" as one of two "white hot-stormers" on the album.

Track listing

Personnel
The Crocketts
Davey MacManus ("Davey Crockett") – vocals, guitar; production and mixing on "Happy as a Bastard" and "That's for Sure"
Dan Harris ("Dan Boone") – guitar; production and mixing on "Happy as a Bastard" and "That's for Sure"
Richard Carter ("Rich Wurzel") – bass; production and mixing on "Happy as a Bastard" and "That's for Sure"
Owen Hopkin ("Owen Cash") – drums; production and mixing on "Happy as a Bastard" and "That's for Sure"
Guest musicians
Mary Hopkin – additional vocals on "Chicken vs. Macho"
Additional personnel
Charlie Francis – production and mixing on "Happy as a Bastard" and "That's for Sure", production on "1939 Returning" (August 2000 recording), mixing on "Chicken vs. Macho"
Bird & Bush – production on "Chicken vs. Macho"
Simon Askew – production and mixing on "1939 Returning" (BBC live)
George Thomas – production assistance and mixing assistance on "1939 Returning" (BBC live)

References

2000 singles
The Crocketts songs
2000 songs